The English cricket team in Australia in 1946–47 was captained by Wally Hammond, with Norman Yardley as his vice-captain and Bill Edrich as the senior professional. It played as England in the 1946–47 Ashes series against the Australians and as the MCC in their other matches on the tour. They were regarded as a sound team which was just as strong as Australia, but due to the Second World War they were an ageing side (only Godfrey Evans was under 28) and their bowling depended heavily on Alec Bedser and Doug Wright, who were overused and exhausted as a result. Australia beat England 3-0 in a five-match series to retain the Ashes; England  suffered the worst defeat in a Test series since losing 4–1 to Australia in 1924–25. Since 1881, Tests in Australia were played to finish. That rule was changed for this series, and for the first time in 65 years, a test played in Australia ended in a draw when the third test was drawn.

The MCC saw Hammond leading a "Goodwill Tour" of Australia to re-establish sporting relations after the Second World War, and was told that good sportsmanship was more important that winning the series, an attitude that prevailed into the 1950s and 1960s. The Australian captain Don Bradman was not so constrained and was determined to win the series, and win by a large margin. One English player said "We are the first Ambassadors ever embroiled in a war while on a goodwill mission". The goodwill aspect of the tour meant that Hammond could not publicly complain about the Australian umpires, who he regarded as incompetent.

Unlike the Australians, the selectors preferred to use cricketers who had made their name in the 1930s and selection appeared to be on the basis of pleasing the English public, who only knew the older players. Only Alec Bedser, Godfrey Evans and Norman Yardley had played little or no first-class cricket before the war. Evans, Yardley and Edrich were late choices; Evans as Paul Gibb's understudy, Yardley as vice-captain despite a poor season as an amateur had to be vice-captain and Bill Edrich after he made 222 not out against Northants. Eric Hollies was thought unlucky not to be picked after he took 184 wickets (15.60) including 10/49 in an innings against Notts – 7 bowled and 3 lbw – but he failed in 1950–51. To be fair, few new names suggested themselves; the 26-year-old Reg Simpson had batted well for the RAF in India, but made only 592 runs (24.66) in 1946, the 23-year-old Trevor Bailey was seen only as a good fielder, making 412 runs (31.69) and taking 37 wickets (24.40), and the 24-year-old Jim Laker only took 8 wickets (21.12).

Manager
The manager was Major Rupert Howard of Lancashire who had also managed the last tour, Gubby Allen's "Goodwill Tour" of 1936–37. He knew Hammond well and they took to touring the country in a Jaguar lent to them when they arrived in Australia. Unlike later tours Howard was in charge of both the social calendar and public relations as well as the finances, though they tended to leave the nut and bolts of moving the team around to the baggage-master and scorer Bill Ferguson. The 66-year-old scorer had toured with the MCC since 1907–08 and devised the famous Ferguson Charts which gave greater detail than other scorecards, noting each ball bowled by from which bowler to which batsman. He also invented the radial scoring chart which shows the directions in which a batsman scored his runs.

Captain
Like other brilliant natural sportsmen to whom success has come easily Hammond had little apparent understanding of the problems faced by less gifted mortals, nor did he seem to appreciate the value of the personal word of cheer and advice. He could be very good company when in the right vein, but there were bleak, moody spells which were apt to coincide with his own failures and those of the side...Wally found himself in closer rapport with his manager than with his team, and they were apt to make the many long journeys in a Jaguar, leaving the team to follow by train in the care of Yardley and of the famous old baggage-master, 'Fergie'.
E.W. Swanton

Batsman
Walter Reginald Hammond – better known as Wally Hammond - had been a brilliant young batsmen, but in 1928–29 had forsaken the hook, the cut and the glance and played "through the V", making a record 905 runs (113.12) by creaming the ball through the covers. "Striding down the pavilion steps at Lord's like a stately white galleon in full sail" he would go to the middle where "he hammered the ball with imperious power...Hammond hardly seemed to give the bowler a chance, even though he attacked the bowling constantly" Hammond was recognised as the greatest batsman in the world, is still regarded as one of the greatest players in cricket, and was ranked 9 in ESPN's Legends of cricket. In 1932–33 he made 227 against New Zealand in the First Test after Herbert Sutcliffe and Eddie Paynter had been dismissed for ducks and 336 not out in the next with 34 fours and 10 sixes, the fastest triple century in Test cricket and his series average of 563.00 is unlikely to be exceeded. In 1937 he overtook Jack Hobbs' aggregate of 5,410 Test runs, and his final total of 7,249 runs (58.45) remained a record for 33 years until surpassed by Colin Cowdrey in the 1970s. On the tour he notched up his 167th and last first class century, his 36th first class double century (breaking Bradman's record) and became the seventh man to make 50,000 first class runs after W.G. Grace, Jack Hobbs, Phil Mead, Frank Woolley, Patsy Hendren and Herbert Sutcliffe. As a slip fielder "he had no superior in the world", he was the first fielder to take 100 catches in Tests and his final tally of 110 was a record until Cowdrey beat it in 1968. Hammond was also a Test class fast-medium swing bowler who batsmen compared to Maurice Tate, but he limited this bowling so he could concentrate on his batting.

Rivalry with Bradman

In my opinion the two great players were jealous of one another. There were times in the series when I felt it was not so much a battle between England and Australia as a battle between Bradman and Hammond.
Keith Miller
It was Hammond's misfortune to live in the same age as Don Bradman, the greatest batsmen of them all. Bradman made 974 runs (139.14) in 1930 and thereafter when Hammond made a century Bradman would make a double century, if Hammond struck 200, Bradman would make 300. When England amassed 903/7 at the Oval in 1938 Hammond waited until he had medical assurance that Bradman was unfit to bat before declaring and England won by an innings and 579 runs. Bradman never forgot this – or Bodyline – and when Hammond arrived to play a sporting tour to re-establish cricket after the war he was angered by the Australian captain's determination to win. In the First Test, The English team believed Bradman to have been caught by Jack Ikin off Bill Voce when 28; Bradman believed the ball had bounced straight after hitting the bat (a 'bump ball') and refused to walk. The umpires concurred that Bradman was not out, after which Hammond glared at him and said tensely, "That's a fine way to start a Test series." Bradman went on to make a match-winning 187 and did the same in the Second Test when Ikin caught him off Alec Bedser at 22, Bradman refused to budge and made 234. Hammond thought this was gamesmanship and refused to talk to Bradman for the rest of the tour except to call the toss. Nevertheless, Hammond refused to be drawn into a public war, he did not make official complaints or even reveal to the press his concerns about umpiries, poor wickets, heavy rollers and aggressive fast bowling. "He displayed tact and diplomacy in the interests of cricket, and wherever they went his colleagues were welcomed and liked."

England captain
Hammond was made captain of England in 1938 when he achieved amateur status through being given a top job in a tyre company. This was the age of the "Shamateur", when cricketers were given lucrative posts so that they would qualify for amateur status and captaincy of their county and country. He was with the RAF in South Africa during the war, but returned to play in 1945 and in the first full county season in 1946 made 1,783 runs (84.90) including six centuries in seven innings, making him easily the best batsman in England. Though the old guard at the MCC disliked having an ex-professional as England captain Hammond had no rivals to the post. On his arrival in Australia the news broke that he was divorcing his wife of 17 years to marry a South African beauty queen and the press had a field day. Hammond made centuries in his first two innings on the tour, 131 off Northam (with 19 fours and 4 sixes) and 208 against Western Australia, but suffered from fibrositis and let Yardley captain most of the early tour games. Hammond proved to be aloof and distant and at 43 was a generation older than the rest of his team, who held in him awe. Amateur captains used to readily consult their senior professional, but Hammond the ex-pro rarely sought anybody's advice, and "sphinx-like marched from slip at one end to slip at the other, apparently, as Plum Warner wrote of him 'just letting the game go on'". He ordered his batsmen to stay in their crease and not attack the bowling and had his best bowlers running around the outfield between overs. In the Tests his highest Test score was only 37 and simply failed to concentrate as he used to; "When I consider the hours I have spent against men like Grimmett and O'Reilly, never taking the slightest chance and patiently waiting for the loose ball to come along, I cannot understand why in 1946 I tried to hit spin bowlers off their length before I had been at the wicket ten minutes". Although averse to public speaking Hammond was very popular with the Australian public and was cheered whenever he appeared. One newspaper told its readers "See him while you can. Your grandsons will feel you have let them down if you haven't seen him on their behalf". However, Hammond came "as a cricket god, only to leave a failure both as a batsman and a captain". He retired on his return to England and moved to South Africa, where he remained detached from cricket until he took to the habit of visiting M.J.K. Smith's touring team just before he died in a car accident in 1965.

Batting

It was a formidable array of run-getters who on past efforts appears to tower above everything we could put in the field, and in the absence of O'Reilly the position seemed bleak and without hope. I asked Kippax what he thought...He said "If Hutton, Compton and Hammond are anywhere near their pre-war form I would be willing to concede them 250 runs an innings and ask them not to bat".
Clif Cary

Opening batsmen
Len Hutton had made a record 364 in England's 903/7 declared at the Oval in 1938, still the highest score made by a batsman in an Ashes Test. The Yorkshire batsman was unlikely to match this on his first tour of Australia and he failed expectations until the last two Tests. He had broken his left arm in an accident on a commando course while a sergeant in the Army Physical Training Corps sergeant in the war and after an operation using 46 stitches, grafting bone from his leg onto his arm, which was left 2 inches (5 cm) shorter and weaker than his right. Hutton managed to recraft his technique, using a specially lightened bat, and even improved his batting average after the war. He was the target of Lindwall and Miller's "opening blitz", but his only batting injury was when he was caught on the chin by the New South Wales fast bowler Ginty Lush and taken to hospital just before the Fifth Test. He also suffered from tonsillitis and had to 'retire ill' after reaching 122 in the Fifth Test at Sydney. He was absent for the rest of the match and was flown back to England for a throat operation immediately afterwards. Even so, he topped the England and MCC batting averages on the tour despite bearing the brunt of the Australian fast bowlers and he and Washbrook added 138, 137 and 100 for the first wicket in successive innings, matching the record of Hobbs and Sutcliffe in 1924–25. In 1948–49 they put on 359 against South Africa, still the highest opening stand for England in Test cricket. Cyril Washbrook was the Lancastrian half of the Roses partnership, a batsman noted for his daring hooking and incisive cutting, though he proved a model of self-denial when England needed him. As a selector in 1956 he famously recalled himself, came in at 17/3 and made a match winning 98. The third man was Laurie Fishlock, a popular sportsman who was a left-handed batsman for Surrey and a winger for Crystal Palace and Southampton. He had toured Australia in 1936–37, but then as in 1946–47 he injured his hands, was unable to play for weeks at a time and his form suffered as a result. According to one selector he was only chosen because the public expected him to go.

Top order batsmen

S/L Bill Edrich had been a bomber pilot during the war and won the DFC in the "RAF's most audacious and dangerous low-level bombing raid" of 1941. A gutsy batsman he was "almost indifferent to his own safety. No bowler is too fast to hook; no score too large to defy challenge" and stood up to the bouncers of Lindwall and Miller. Returning to England in 1947 he became an amateur and made a record 3,539 runs (80.43) with 12 centuries, a total only exceeded by his Middlesex Twin Denis Compton who made 3,816 runs (90.85) and 18 centuries in the same season. Compton was the golden boy of post-war cricket "illuminating the seemingly impossible stroke and playing shots which are so late that they appear to be afterthoughts." He was restricted by Hammond's orders to stick to the crease as he liked to walk down the pitch to upset the slow bowlers – relying on his quick eye to keep him out of trouble – and was a shadow of himself until the Fourth Test when he ignored the captain's advice and made two centuries. His most famous stroke was the "Compton Sweep" in which he would pivot and drive the ball to long leg. Many others tried to copy this "backward drive" with fatal results, it was a product of Compton's own genius. Young Joe Hardstaff was the son of Joe Hardstaff of Notts and England and was a noted stylist "all ease and elegance" He had toured Australia in 1936–37, but failed to make a century and his Test career was stunted by the enmity of Gubby Allen. His selection was based on an innings of 205 not out against India in the Lords Test, but he had an otherwise poor season and failed on the tour.

Middle and lower order batsmen
The MCC chose a number of all-rounders for their team, but none of real quality. The balding and bespectacled Paul Gibb had a sensational tour of South Africa before in 1938–39, when he hit 473 runs (59.12) and two centuries, but in Australia was found to have a weakness against leg-spin and failed. He was chosen for the First Test ahead of Godfrey Evans because of his batting ability, but Evans proved to be a decent batsman, a perky, attacking player who tried to take a run off every ball, but in the Fourth Test he went for a record 95 minutes before scoring while Compton made a century at the other end. At 28 Jack Ikin was one of the younger English players on the tour and apart from five first class matches in 1938 and 1939 he was a post-war player. Not noted for his footwork or strokeplay he was a gritty left-hander who was picked even though he only made one century for Lancashire in 1946. He was popular in Australia as he was a Tobruk Rat who had fought alongside the Australian 9th Division in North Africa. Norman Yardley was a sensible player who liked to play his strokes on the leg-side and though he never made a Test century was a good man in a crisis. James Langridge, Peter Smith and Bill Voce were bowlers who regularly made runs and even centuries for their counties, but Doug Wright's only hundred had become before the war and afterwards was relegated to the bottom of the batting order. Alec Bedser was a tailender who was capable of hitting a few runs on occasion and Dick Pollard's lack of batting ability was cited as one of the reasons why he was not picked for a Test in the series.

Bowling
Bill Edrich did some service as a fastish bowler with a slinging action while Norman Yardley's all-round skill won him a place in all the Tests. With his deceptively plain-looking medium-pace he actually took Bradman's wicket in three successive Test innings, and without any help from a fielder at that. But our out-cricket was simply not good enough. Wright was the best bowler (23 at 44 runs apiece), Bedser was still an enthusiastic and tireless learner (15 at 54), but Bill Voce aged 37, in one of the hottest Australian summers, could not recapture the old magical fire.
E.W. Swanton

Pace bowlers
Like the batsmen the England bowlers were mostly old hands who had been playing before the war, unfortunately old bowlers rarely do well in Australia and they suffered. Bill Voce was a name well-known down under, he had been Harold Larwood's left-arm new-ball partner in the Bodyline series of 1932–33 and had taken 8/66 using the same tactics when the Australians played Notts in 1934. He was allowed on the "Goodwill Tour" of 1936–37 only after a public apology and took 17 wickets in the first two Tests to see England go 2–0 up in the series, but then he developed a muscle strain and Australia won the last three Tests. In 1946 he was 37 years old, the most senior England player after Hammond, but only a shadow of his former self. He failed to take a wicket in the Tests and was sidelined with a leg strain. Voce had been a spinner in his youth (until he saw Larwood bowl) and Hammond asked him to switch to slow bowling in the middle of the tour, but it was too late for him to change. Like Voce Dick Pollard was granted leave by the army to tour Australia, but was 34 years old, overweight and found that his swing bowling did not take to Australian conditions. He had taken 25 wickets (23.64) in the Victory Tests and was unlucky to not be chosen for a Test in the series, but still had some good seasons for Lancashire on his return home. The medium-fast bowling of Alec Bedser was reckoned to be the equal to that of Maurice Tate despite his poor figures, and he improved tremendously on tour. Making his debut against India at the age of 28 Bedser took 11/145 in his first Test and 11/93 in his second. In Australia he was overbowled and exhausted and found that his natural in-swingers were liked by Australian leg-side batsmen like Sid Barnes. To counter this he gripped the ball across the seam like a spinner and the result was an in-swinging leg-break which would take 30 wickets (16.03) on his return in 1950–51. Don Bradman wrote "the ball with which Alec Bedser bowled me in the Adelaide Test Match was, I think, the finest ever to take my wicket. It must have come three-quarters of the way straight on my off-stump, then suddenly dipped in to pitch on the leg stump, only to turn off the pitch and hit the middle and off stumps." Bedser would take 236 wickets in Tests (a record until 1963) and was the mainstay of the England bowling attack in the decade after the war. Bill Edrich was an enthusiastic fast bowler who could generate a fair pace off a short run up, but his greatest asset was a willingness to bowl. Nevertheless, he was given the new ball in the Second Test, returned the best figures (3/79) and top-scored in both innings with 71 and 119. Norman Yardley was one of the finds of the tour, a 'bits and pieces' all rounder called on to bowl due to the failings of others he dismissed Bradman three times in a row and proved to be a valuable support bowler.

Spin bowlers
Doug Wright was seen as England's trump card when he arrived in Australia, but he was either the unluckiest or the most over-rated spinner to tour Australia. Don Bradman said he was the best leg-spinner to tour Australia since Sydney Barnes 35 years before, and Keith Miller thought he was the best leg-spinner he knew after Bill O'Reilly. After Tich Freeman retired Wright became Kent's main spinner, taking 2,056 wickets (23.98) and a record seven first class hat-tricks. His long rollicking run up and brisk pace gave away many no-balls and too often he served up full tosses and long hops, but he turned the ball fiercely and his googly had even the best batsmen groping. His ability to run through a side made him the terror of the County circuit, but he rarely achieved this in Tests. In the Fifth Test at Sydney his 7/105 dismissed Australia for 253 and in 1947 his 10/175 in the Second Test gave England a 10 wicket victory over South Africa. His great asset was that he always looked as if he was about to take a wicket, but in Australia in 1946–47 and again in 1950–51 he proved too expensive and like Bedser was overbowled. Their second leg-spinner was Peter Smith, who was preferred to Eric Hollies because of his batting, but he injured a finger on the journey to Australia and had an appendix removed once there. Even so, he was effective in tour matches - his 9/121 against NSW is the best bowling return by an Englishman in Australia - but was understandably below par in his only Test. James Langridge was a veteran Slow Left Arm bowler who started his trade in 1924, and had taken 92 wickets (22.11) in 1946, but he was 41 years old on his first tour of Australia and just when he appeared to be finding his form he strained a muscle and could not play. Jack Ikin was a part-time leg-spinner whose bowling was thought to be of all round status early in his career (helped by the very poor wickets at Old Trafford), but Hammond used him rarely and he proved to be expensive in the Tests.

Fielding

His leg side keeping was on occasions as superlative as his nimble footed agility was amazing. He was always in top gear and continually chasing balls, even to a few yards of the fence, so intense was his enthusiasm. Evans loves cricket. Every minute in the middle brings him untold joy and pleasure, just as his acrobatic acts thrilled all who saw him.
Clif Cary

Wicketkeepers
Paul Gibb was the first choice wicketkeeper at the start of the tour and hailed as the new Les Ames. An amateur batsman for Yorkshire he was a part-time wicketkeeper who was chosen to support Ames in South Africa in 1938–39, though in the end he played in all the Tests as a batsman. The 41-year-old Ames retired as Kent's wicketkeeper after the war in favour of Godfrey Evans, though he continued to play as a batsman until 1950. Evans was taken as the reserve keeper and as Doug Wright's county keeper was thought to have the edge over Gibbs, but was still learning his trade and had dropped Bradman in the game against South Australia. Both keepers fumbled chances on the tour, but Evans, playing in only his second full season of cricket was seen as the most improved player in the team and took lessons from Bert Oldfield who "did everything he could to assist him to attain the superb heights he ultimately reached". In the end Hammond chose Gibbs for the first Test, but Evans came in for the Second and thereafter remained England first choice for 13 years. His presence made an immediate difference and improved the England fielding all round. The Australians made over a thousand runs before Evans conceded a bye.

Fielders
MCC missed chances innumerable, and, looking back over one's cuttings, it comes as a surprise to read how poor the English fielding, and especially the catching, was on this tour.
E.W. Swanton
This was one of the last teams to use old fashioned practice of putting the old men in the in-field and the young men in the out-field. As a result, Bill Voce was put in the slips and James Langridge in the gully, so many catches went begging. Meanwhile, the bowlers Doug Wright and Alec Bedser tired themselves chasing the ball around the ground when they should have been resting. Bill Edrich and Len Hutton were specialist slip fielders, Denis Compton was a good fielder anywhere and Jack Ikin took 31 catches in his 18 Tests and "as a fielder he had no superior in the slips or at short leg". Cyril Washbrook was an excellent cover fieldsman who flaunted his ability to throw down the stumps like a bullet and "if the runs he saved could have been added to those he made he would have boasted an aggregate to make Bradman envious". Australian batsmen soon learnt not to run if the ball went anywhere near him.

MCC touring team
By the convention of the time gentleman amateurs have their initials in front of their surname and professional players have their initials after their name, if their initials were used at all.

First Test – Brisbane

See Main Article – 1946–47 Ashes series

Second Test – Sydney

See Main Article – 1946–47 Ashes series

Third Test – Melbourne

See Main Article – 1946–47 Ashes series

Fourth Test – Adelaide

See Main Article – 1946–47 Ashes series

Fifth Test – Sydney

See Main Article – 1946–47 Ashes series

Further reading
 Bill Frindall, The Wisden Book of Test Cricket 1877–1978, Wisden, 1979
 Chris Harte, A History of Australian Cricket, Andre Deutsch, 1993
 Alan Hill, The Bedsers: Twinning Triumphs, Mainstream Publishing, 2002
 Ray Lindwall, Flying Stumps, Marlin Books, 1977
 Ray Robinson, On Top Down Under, Cassell, 1975
 E.W. Swanton (ed), Barclay's World of Cricket, Willow, 1986

External sources
 CricketArchive tour itinerary

References
 John Arlott, John Arlott's 100 Greatest Batsmen, MacDonald Queen Anne Press, 1986
 Peter Arnold, The Illustrated Encyclopedia of World Cricket, W. H. Smith, 1985
 Ashley Brown, The Pictorial History of Cricket, Bison, 1988
 Clif Cary, Cricket Controversy, Test matches in Australia 1946–47, T. Werner Laurie Ltd, 1948
 Keith Miller, Cricket Crossfire, Oldbourne Press, 1956
 A.G. Moyes, A Century of Cricketers, Angus and Robertson, 1950
 E.W. Swanton, Swanton in Australia with MCC 1946–1975, Fontana/Collins, 1975
 Frank Tyson, In the Eye of the Typhoon, Recollections of the Marylebone Cricket Club tour of Australia 1954/55, The Parrs Wood Press, 2004
 Bob Willis and Patrick Murphy, Starting with Grace, A Pictorial Celebration of Cricket 1864–1986, Stanley Paul, 1986
References using Cricinfo or Wisden may require free registration for access.

1946 in Australian cricket
1946 in English cricket
1947 in Australian cricket
1947 in English cricket
Australian cricket seasons from 1945–46 to 1969–70
1946-47
International cricket competitions from 1945–46 to 1960
1946-47